Bartlemy is a small village and townland in County Cork, Ireland. It is located in the civil parish of Gortroe close to the town of Rathcormac. The local Roman Catholic church is dedicated to Saint Bartholomew and was built . A "holy well", dedicated to the same saint, is located to the south-west. The village's former post office (built ) closed in 1991. As of the start of the 2020 school year, the local national (primary) school had over 110 pupils enrolled.

See also
 Rathcormac massacre

References

Towns and villages in County Cork